One of Us (translit. Echad Mi'shelanu) is a 1989 Israeli drama film directed by Uri Barbash. It stars Alon Aboutboul, Sharon Alexander, Yoel Ben-Simhon, Shaul Mizrahi, Alon Neuman, Ofer Shikartsi and Dalia Shimko.

Plot 
A Palestinian guerrilla is taken alive after breaking into an army outpost in the occupied territories with a group of armed men and killing several Israeli soldiers. His subsequent death at the hands of his captors is treated as a murder investigation and a military official is sent to interrogate the survivors.

Cast 
 Alon Aboutboul as Yotam
 Sharon Alexander as Rafa
 Yoel Ben-Simhon as Platoon Soldier
 Shaul Mizrahi as The White Angel
 Alon Neuman as Nahshon
 Ofer Shikartsi as Erez
 Dalia Shimko as Tamar

Reception
The film was submitted by Israel for the Academy Award for Best Foreign Language Film at the 62nd Academy Awards, but was not selected.

See also
 List of submissions to the 62nd Academy Awards for Best Foreign Language Film
 List of Israeli submissions for the Academy Award for Best Foreign Language Film

References

External links 
 

1989 films
Israeli drama films
1989 drama films
Films about the Israel Defense Forces